Khaled Ahmad Khalaf Matar  (born August 15, 1983 in Kuwait City) is a Kuwaiti footballer who plays in Attack for Kuwaiti Premier League club Al Arabi and the Kuwait national football team with his brothers in Al-Arabi Khalaf Ahmed Khalaf and Ali Khalaf.

He played for Al-Arabi in the 2007 AFC Champions League group stage.

He is away from football for 2 and a half seasons due to injury in his leg and has returned to football in Al-Arabi Sporting Club in season 2014-15.

Youth career
Khalid started his youth career in Al-Arabi SC which he scored many goals for the team and moved on to the 1st team with Ali Maqseed and many other player from the youth team.

Career
After he joined the first team he was a fantastic sub for the coach where he used to substitute him when the team is down or tied he would score with  Firas Al-Khatib.

(2006-07)
But Khaled truly made his dominance in Kuwaiti Football in the 2006-2007 season when he scored 2 goals against Qadsia SC. through that season, by scoring in the Final against Kazma Sporting Clubin the Kuwait Crown Prince Cup and Crowning them champions for the 5th time and his first.

2007-08
In 2007-08 Khaled scored 14 goals that season through the league and 3 domestic cups but won the Kuwait Emir Cup At the end of the season.

2008-09
In 2008-09 Khaled scored 7 goals all season which he was one of the starting players in the team and Kuwait national football team he won the Kuwait Super Cup at the start of the season and scored 2 goals in the Classico through that Al-Arabi SC have struggled in the league by going down to 5th position and going out from Kuwait Crown Prince Cup by losing to Al-Jahra SC 3-2 but made it to the Kuwait Emir Cup Final but lost 2-1.

2009-10
After Firas Al-Khatib left the club to join their rivals Qadsia SC Al-Arabi SC had a struggle through the year as finishing 6th in the league and as runner up to the Crown Cup while Khaled scored 7 goals that season.

2010-11

Khaled played half the season until the Waff Cup with the international team he got injured in his knee where he couldn't play the whole season

2011-14

After his recovery he came back and won The Kuwait Crown Prince Cup but after that his Knee got injured again and was spelled out for 2 and a half seasons from the club but all championship the club won was added to his career since he was part of the team.

2014-15
THE GREAT RETURN as of the 2014-15 season Khaled returned and was fully healthy to play again but he played 1 game with the reserves and it was against Burgan SC he played 45 minutes only with one assist and never played a game after those 45 minutes.
and Took another injury after that match in his foot which ruled him out for 1 and a half months and returned to play the last 8 mins against Al-Naser SC in the 2-1 win in the Reserves league. And was crowned champions of the Kuwait Crown Prince Cup for the third time in his career and the 7th for his team.

his Cup return was vs Kazma SC in Kuwait Federation Cup group-stage mach 1-1.

International goals

Honors

Club
VIVA Premier League 2001–02
Kuwait Emir Cup 2004–05, 2005–06, 2007–08
Kuwait Crown Prince Cup 2006–07, 2011–12, 2014–15 
Kuwait Super Cup 2008, 2012
Kuwait Federation Cup 2013-14

International
Gulf Cup of Nations 2010
West Asian Football Federation Championship 2010

Individual
Kuwait Super Cup top scorer of 2008

References

1983 births
Living people
Kuwaiti footballers
2011 AFC Asian Cup players
Al-Arabi SC (Kuwait) players
Sportspeople from Kuwait City
Kuwait international footballers
Association football wingers
Kuwait Premier League players